This article lists political parties in Madagascar.

In Madagascar, most of the constituencies elect one, some of them two, members of the national assembly. This means that the political party with most votes may get an absolute majority in the national assembly without an absolute majority of the votes. This system makes coalition governments less likely.

Parties

Parliamentary parties

Other parties

Former parties

See also
 Politics of Madagascar
 List of political parties by country
 Malagasy Communist Party

Madagascar
 
Political parties
Political parties
Madagascar